Maluk Das (Hindi:मलुक दास, 1574) was a devotional poet-saint from Prayagraj (Allahabad), India, a religious poet of the Bhakti Movement. His two Compositions are famous: Ratna khan and Gyan Bodh. He spoke against the show off and Maya.

Life

Maluk das was born in Kada, near Allababad, in 1574. Themes of his songs include social reform, religious tolerance, goodwill among men, equality and the oneness of God. In this way he resembles other singers of the Bhakti movement including Kabir and Guru Nanak.

He believed that God is in form who created the universe and still pervades through each and every shape.

The Emperor Aurangzeb recognised Das's value and donated two villages to him and his disciples.

A Muslim Officer sent by Aurangzeb to Maluk Das received the name Meer Mahdav, a combination of the Muslim name Meer and the Hindu word Madhav. His grave stands near Das's own.

His birthplace and grave have been refurbished by Swami Yogiraj Nanak Chand.

Teachings and legacy
His 2 popular creations are  Ratan Khan and Gyan Bodh. After meeting with God, Maluk Das Ji uttered the following speech -

Japo re man Satguru naam Kabir || Ek samay Guru bansi bajaai kalandri ke teer || Sur-nar muni thak gaye, ruk gaya dariya neer || Kaanshi taj Guru maghar aaye, dono deen ke peer || Koi gaade koi agni jaraavae, dhoonda na paaya shareer || Chaar daag se Satguru nyaara, ajro amar shareer || Das Malook salook kahat hai, khojo khasam Kabir ||

Maluk Das says to his mind (Man) that chant the name of that God Kabir Sahib. Chant the mantra that God has given. Maluk Das states that when Satguru Kabir Ji played Bansi on the bank of river Yamuna, the gods from heaven also came in their Vimaan and stood and the river i.e. the water of the river also stopped at the same place. When Pir / Satguru Kabir Ji of both religions came to Maghar from Kashi to leave the body, some (Muslim) would say that we will bury Kabir's body in the ground and some (Hindu) would say that we will burn Kabir's body in the fire.  A quarrel broke out over this matter.  But when they lifted the sheet, they did not find the body of Sadguru Kabir. They found fragrant flowers. Because Sadguru Kabir is different from the four ways of final rites. Then, Maluk Das Ji said, find Kabir (Khasam) Master/husband of soul.

References

Sources
Karine Schomer, W. H. McLeod (eds), The Sants: Studies in a Devotional Tradition of India, Motilal Banarsidass, 1987 .
T. Phillips, The Missionary's Vade Mecum, Or, A Condensed Account of the Religious Literature, Sects, Schools, and Customs of the Hindus in the North West of India, J. Thomas, 1847.
George Small, A Handbook of Sanskṛit Literature: with Appendices Descriptive of the Mythology, Castes, and Religious Sects of the Hindus, 1866.
Rajmani Tigunait, From Death to Birth: Understanding Karma and Reincarnation, Himalayan Institute Press, 1997 .
The Concept of God in Maluka's Poetry

Indian male poets
17th-century Hindu religious leaders
17th-century Indian poets
Poets from Uttar Pradesh
17th-century male writers